Karen Pearlman is a film scholar, known for her pioneering work in articulating underlying principles concerning what rhythm in film is and the purpose it serves in modulating cycles of tension and release for viewers. Currently Lecturer in Film Production at Macquarie University, she is the author of Cutting Rhythms, Shaping the Film Edit (Focal Press, 2009) and its second edition Cutting Rhythms, Intuitive Film Editing (Focal Press, 2016).

The focus of Pearlman's research, first developed when Head of Screen Studies at the Australian Film, Television and Radio School, is on the connection of film theory and practice by making conceptual thinking accessible and useful to practitioners. She co-directs The Physical TV Company with Richard James Allen. In 2009 Dr Pearlman was elected President of The Australian Screen Editors Guild (ASE).

Background influences
Many of Pearlman's ideas about rhythm, editing, and affect derive from her career as a professional dancer with the Bill T. Jones/Arnie Zane Dance Company; dancing and choreographing in the theaters, lofts and experimental dance venues of Australia, the US and in Europe. As well as using her understanding of kinesthetic empathy in her theorizing, she applies her choreographic sensibility to her own editing and dramaturgy.

Books

External links
Dr Karen Pearlman at the Macquarie University
Cutting Rhythms: Intuitive Film Editing
Karen Pearlman Filmmaking Blog
Cutting Rhythms: Shaping the Film Edit
Performing The Unnameable: An Anthology of Australian Performance Texts
The Physical TV Company
The Physical TV Channel on YouTube
The Physical TV Company Website selected for preservation by Pandora, Australia's Web Archive, at the National Library of Australia
Dr Karen Pearlman on ABC Radio National Australia Talks Movies: Dance Film
Reviews, Articles and Books by and Interviews with Dr Karen Pearlman
Karen Pearlman at the Manuscripts Collection, the State Library of New South Wales
Karen Pearlman at the National Film and Sound Archive

Portrait of Karen Pearlman at the National Library of Australia

References

1960 births
Australian female dancers
American female dancers
Dancers from Missouri
Australian editors
American editors
Australian choreographers
American choreographers
Australian women film directors
American film directors
Australian film producers
Film producers from Missouri
Living people
Writers from St. Louis
American women film producers
American women editors
Australian women editors
Australian documentary film directors
Australian documentary filmmakers
Australian women film producers
21st-century American women